Classical Armenian (in Eastern Armenian pronunciation: Grabar, Western Armenian: Krapar; meaning "literary [language]"; also Old Armenian or Liturgical Armenian) is the oldest attested form of the Armenian language. It was first written down at the beginning of the 5th century, and all Armenian literature from then through the 18th century is in Classical Armenian. Many ancient manuscripts originally written in Ancient Greek, Persian, Hebrew, Syriac and Latin survive only in Armenian translation.

Classical Armenian continues to be the liturgical language of the Armenian Apostolic Church and the Armenian Catholic Church and is often learned by Biblical, Intertestamental, and Patristic scholars dedicated to textual studies. Classical Armenian is also important for the reconstruction of the Proto-Indo-European language.

Phonology

Vowels
There are seven monophthongs: 
The vowel transcribed u is spelled using the Armenian letters for ow (ու) but it is not actually a diphthong.

There are also traditionally six diphthongs:
 ay (այ), aw (աւ, later օ), ea (եա), ew (եւ), iw (իւ), oy (ոյ).

Consonants
In the following table is the Classical Armenian consonantal system. The stops and affricate consonants have, in addition to the more common voiced and unvoiced series, also a separate aspirated series, transcribed with the notation used for Ancient Greek rough breathing after the letter: p῾, t῾, c῾, č῾, k῾. Each phoneme has two symbols in the table. The left indicates the pronunciation in International Phonetic Alphabet (IPA); the right one is the corresponding symbol in the Armenian alphabet.

See also
List of Armenian writers
Proto-Armenian language
Armenian alphabet

Sources 
 Adjarian, Hrachia. (1971-9) Etymological Root Dictionary of the Armenian Language. Vol. I – IV. Yerevan: Yerevan State University.
 Meillet, Antoine. (1903) Esquisse d’une grammaire comparée de l’arménien classique.
 Thomson, Robert W. (1989) An Introduction to Classical Armenian. Caravan Books.
 Godel, Robert. (1975) An Introduction to the Study of Classical Armenian. Wiesbaden: Dr. Ludwig Reichert Verlag

References

External links

 Classical Armenian Online by Todd B. Krause and Jonathan Slocum, free online lessons at the Linguistics Research Center at the University of Texas at Austin
New Dictionary of the Armenian Language (Nor Bargirk Haekazian Lezvi, Նոր Բառգիրք Հայկազեան Լեզուի), Venice 1836-1837. The seminal dictionary of Classical Armenian.  Includes Armenian to Latin, and Armenian to Greek.
Pocket Dictionary of the Armenian Language (Arrdzern Barraran Haekazian Lezvi, Առձեռն Բառարան Հայկազնեան Լեզուի), Venice 1865 (second edition).
New Dictionary Armenian-English (Նոր Բառգիրք Հայ-Անգլիարէն), Venice, 1875-9.
Grabar Dictionary (Գրաբարի Բառարան), Ruben Ghazarian, Yerevan, 2000.
Grabar Thesaurus (Գրաբարի Հոմանիշների Բառարան), Ruben Ghazarian, Yerevan, 2006.
A grammar, Armenian and English by Paschal Aucher and Lord Byron. Venice 1873
Brief introduction to Classical Armenian also known as Grabar
 glottothèque - Ancient Indo-European Grammars online, an online collection of introductory videos to Ancient Indo-European languages produced by the University of Göttingen 

Armenian languages
Armenian, Classical
Armenian
Armenian
Armenian Apostolic Church
Languages attested from the 5th century